was a Japanese professional wrestler, better known by the ring name .

He joined Japan Pro Wrestling Alliance in August 1967. He trained under Karl Istaz, and debuted in 1971. After becoming one of the original All Japan Pro Wrestling wrestlers, he won the All Asia Tag Team Championship with Akihisa Mera in October 1976. He retired in 1977.

All Japan Pro Wrestling held a ceremony in his honor during an event on 16 October 2004 in Iida, Nagano.

Championships and accomplishments
All Japan Pro Wrestling
All Asia Tag Team Championship (1 time) – with Akihisa Mera
World Championship Wrestling (Australia)
NWA Austra-Asian Tag Team Championship (3 times) – with Hito Tojo (1), Waldo Von Erich (1), Les Roberts (1)

References

External links

Japanese male professional wrestlers
1947 births
2004 deaths
People from Ebetsu, Hokkaido
All Asia Tag Team Champions
NWA Austra-Asian Tag Team Champions
20th-century professional wrestlers